Robert Murzeau (1909–1990) was a French actor of stage, film and television.

Selected filmography
 Destiny Has Fun (1947)
 The Husbands of Leontine (1947)
 Monsieur Vincent (1947)
 To the Eyes of Memory (1948)
 The King (1949)
 L'extravagante Théodora (1950)
 Moumou (1951)
 Atoll K (1951)
 The Lovers of Marianne (1953)
 Madame du Barry (1954)
 Maid in Paris (1956)
 Short Head (1956)

References

Bibliography
 Goble, Alan. The Complete Index to Literary Sources in Film. Walter de Gruyter, 1999.

External links
 

1909 births
1990 deaths
French male film actors
French male stage actors
People from La Rochelle